Dymcoff Crag (‘Dymcoff Kamak’ \'dim-kov 'ka-m&k\) is the rocky, partly ice-free peak rising to 1360 m in Lovech Heights on Nordenskjöld Coast in Graham Land.  It surmounts Rogosh Glacier to the west and south.  The feature is named after the Bulgarian engineer Nicolas Dymcoff (1861-1937), whose project ‘Étoile de la Concorde’ published in 1917 envisaged the establishment of a world organization for the preservation of peace and fostering cooperation among nations.

Location
British mapping in 1978.

Maps
 British Antarctic Territory.  Scale 1:200000 topographic map.  DOS 610 Series, Sheet W 64 60.  Directorate of Overseas Surveys, Tolworth, UK, 1978.
 Antarctic Digital Database (ADD). Scale 1:250000 topographic map of Antarctica. Scientific Committee on Antarctic Research (SCAR). Since 1993, regularly upgraded and updated.

Notes

References
 Dymcoff Crag. SCAR Composite Antarctic Gazetteer.
 Bulgarian Antarctic Gazetteer. Antarctic Place-names Commission. (details in Bulgarian, basic data in English)

External links
 Dymcoff Crag. Copernix satellite image

Mountains of Graham Land
Oscar II Coast
Bulgaria and the Antarctic